San Francisco Public Press, a.k.a. SF Public Press, is a non-profit online and print news organization covering the Bay Area. It was founded in 2009. The organization receives funding from The San Francisco Foundation and is fiscally sponsored by Independent Art & Media. The organization's professed goal is to do for print and online news what public media has done for radio and television.

The Public Press is unique among local online startups in that it has published print newspaper editions of its content. Tom Goldstein, a professor at the UC Berkeley Graduate School of Journalism told the San Francisco Chronicle that the move, "strikes me as audacious," adding that the move set the Press "apart, and there may be great benefit in being set apart."

In Fall, 2010 Public Press won an award from the Society of Professional Journalists for explanatory journalism for a series of pieces published online and in print about plans to develop San Francisco's Treasure Island. The idea for the package was hatched by Jeremy Adam Smith, chief editor of Shareable at the time, who also contributed reporting to the series. The press release from SPJ said: "The exhaustively reported package - which exposed the seemingly pipe-dream quality of the project, the political cronyism behind it and the widespread uprooting that the redevelopment will cause - was done on a shoestring budget with funding from Shareable.net and micro-donations via Spot.Us."

In 2021, the Public Press received four 1st place awards from The San Francisco Press Club. In 2022, three Public Press reporters won SPJ awards in "Health Reporting" and "Community Journalism" categories.

In 2019, the Public Press launched KSFP-LP, a low-power FM station at 102.5 FM.

References

External links

Newspapers published in the San Francisco Bay Area